Wollogorang may refer to:
Wollogorang, New South Wales, a locality
Wollogorang Station, Northern Territory
Wollogorang Important Bird Area, within Wollogorang Station
Settlement Creek, known in the local Ganggalida indigenous language as Wollogorang